Ali Sulieman (born on 1 January 2000) is a professional footballer who plays as a forward for Ethiopian Premier League club Hawassa City. Born in Saudi Arabia, he represents the Eritrea national team.

Early life
Sulieman was born in Jeddah, Saudi Arabia to Eritrean parents who fled the country. The family returned to Eritrea when Sulieman was four months old.

Club career
Domestically Sulieman played for Red Sea FC of the Eritrean Premier League. He was spotted by the club at age 16 when he was competing in a zonal tournament in Asmara. He joined the club which was competing with at least three others to sign the striker. He was top scorer in the Premier League two times. 

In July 2021 he joined Ethiopian Premier League club Bahir Dar Kenema F.C. on a two-year deal, becoming the second Eritrean player in the league, along with Robel Teklemichael. The player was spotted by the club in Eritrea's matches against Ethiopia in the 2021 CECAFA U-23 Challenge Cup held in Bahir Dar. Sulieman made his competitive debut for the club on 27 September 2021 in a 3–0 victory over Adama City in the 2021 Addis Ababa City Cup. He was named Man of the Match for his performance which included his first goal and assist for the club. Three days later he was injured in a victory over Jimma Aba Jifar F.C. which saw Bahir Dar reach the final of the tournament. He was expected to miss the final match as he was to be sidelined at least twenty days. During the 2021–22 season he made twenty six league appearances, scoring five goals.

In July 2022 at the conclusion of the season, it was announced that Suleiman had signed for fellow Ethiopian Premier League club Hawassa City.

International career
Sulieman made his senior international debut on 4 September 2019 in a 2022 FIFA World Cup qualification match against Namibia. He also scored his first goal in the eventual 2–1 defeat. Later that month he was part of Eritrea’s squad for the 2019 CECAFA U-20 Championship. He scored in Group Stage matches against Sudan and Djibouti. He added a brace against Zanzibar in the quarter-finals as part of the 5–0 victory. Eritrea went on to win the bronze medal in the tournament.

In July 2021 he was part of Eritrea's squad that competed at the 2021 CECAFA U-23 Challenge Cup. He scored a hat-trick in the nation's opening match against Ethiopia, earning a 3–3 draw. He later scored in a 1–1 rematch draw against Ethiopia in the classification round. His second-half goal forced penalty kicks, during which Sulieman converted as Eritrea eventually won the match. Following the tournament he received the top scorer award with four goals.

Career statistics

Scores and results list Eritrea's goal tally first, score column indicates score after each Sulieman goal.

References

External links
 
 
 Ali Sulieman at Soccer.et
 

2000 births
Living people
Eritrean footballers
Association football forwards
Eritrea international footballers
Eritrean Premier League players
Red Sea FC players
Bahir Dar Kenema F.C. players
Eritrean expatriate footballers
Eritrean expatriate sportspeople in Ethiopia
Expatriate footballers in Ethiopia